The Swan Range is a mountain range in western Montana in the United States. The range is bounded by the South Fork Flathead River to the east, the Flathead River to the north and northwest, the Swan River to the west, and lie to the southwest of Glacier National Park, just south of the Canada–US border. Major cities near the Swan Range include Kalispell and Bigfork to the northeast, and Seeley Lake on the south.

Etymology
The name may have originated from trumpeter swans that once populated Swan Lake, but none are found there today. The river, range and lake may have also been named after Emmett Swan, a long-time resident of the Swan Valley.

Geography

The Swan Range, part of the Kootenay Mountains, is bordered by the Mission Range, a smaller mountain range, to the west, and by the similar-sized Flathead Range to the east and northeast. The highest peak is  Holland Peak, situated in the southern quarter of the range in Missoula County. Streams running off the east side of the range drain into the  South Fork Flathead River. Badrock Canyon, through which flows the Flathead River, separates the Swan Range from the Whitefish Range in the north. The range is part of the Pend Oreille River drainage basin, which eventually drains to the Columbia River.

The Swan River forms much of the western boundary of the range, flowing through a broad valley between the Swan and Mission ranges. Flathead Lake, the second largest freshwater lake in the western US, is situated west of the Swan Range and separated from it by the Mission Range. The Swan Range's boundary with the Flathead Range slowly diminishes as it progresses south - it is in the middle and north parts that this boundary is clearly distinguished. Many of the valleys dissecting the Swan Range drain into the South Fork of the Flathead - the water divide of the range lies more to the west.

"The range to the east of [the Swan River valley] is the Swan Range. It is the highest and least broken ridge in the region, the higher peaks rising to ten and eleven thousand feet."

Listed from north to south, the cities and towns bordering the Swan Range are Columbia Falls, La Salle, Creston, Bigfork, Seeley Lake and Lincoln. While the southern part lies in the Bob Marshall Wilderness and the east part is largely undeveloped, the west side is used for some ranching and parallels Montana Highway 83.

Highest peaks

See also
List of mountain ranges in Montana
North Fork Flathead River

Notes

Works cited
Federal Writers' Project (1939). Montana: A State Guide Book. U.S. History Publishers. .
National Geographic Society (1902). National Geographic Magazine (Volume 13). Harvard University.

External links
 Swan Range

Mountain ranges of Montana
Landforms of Flathead County, Montana